April Bey is a Los Angeles-based contemporary visual artist best known for her mixed media work which creates commentary on contemporary Black female rhetoric. Bey's collage work intertwines a host of materials such as caulking, resin, wood and fabric. Focusing on Black women, Bey captures passion and strength, power and sensuality in her work, which explores the resilience of women and the hypocrisy of societal expectations where women are concerned. Bey uses photographic images of Black female figures in contemporary culture such as Chimamanda Ngozi Adichie, Solange, Issa Rae, and Michaela Coel with text overlaid which speaks  of the narratives Black women are currently creating about their identity. Her work has been exhibited at Band of Vices Gallery, Coagula Curatorial, Liquid Courage Gallery and Barnsdall Art Park's Municipal Art Gallery.

Bey grew up on the island New Providence, The Bahamas. She earned a BFA degree in drawing in 2009 from Ball State University, and an MFA in painting in 2014 at California State University, Northridge. She is a tenured professor in the department of Studio Arts at Glendale Community College. Bey is currently represented by the Gavlak Gallery.

April Bey's first solo museum exhibition titled, Atlantica, The Gilda Region opened on May 26, 2021, in Los Angeles at the California African American Museum. It is an immersive installation that discusses Afrofuturism, queerness, feminism, and internet culture in Black America.

Notes 

Living people
Mixed-media artists
21st-century American women artists
Artists from Los Angeles
African-American women artists
Year of birth missing (living people)
Place of birth missing (living people)
21st-century African-American women
21st-century African-American artists